Storm is a 1999 American science fiction thriller film directed by Harris Done and starring Luke Perry and Martin Sheen. The story and screenplay were written by Done. The story talks about the secret weather control experiment which goes awry.

Plot
The film begins on August 23, 1992 with the top-secret weather experiment led by Air Force General James Roberts off the coast of Florida. The team uses a specially modified cargo plane to launch a special generator into the developing storm to enhance its power. As the plane is destroyed by a lightning strike, the control of the experiment is lost and within a few hours the storm develops into the hurricane Andrew which devastates Miami. The details about the experiments are buried after the disaster.

The story then moves to 1999 where Dr. Ron Young and his assistant Dr. Brian Newmeyer perform the experiment designed to steer the path of the storm with the generator towed by a small airplane. While the experiment is successful, Dr. Young's flight license is revoked because of the airspace violation which nearly causes the accident. His boss has enough of the risky experiments and decides to fire both Dr. Young and Dr. Newmeyer.

Soon after this Ron is approached by a mysterious man named Tom Holt who knows many details of his research. He offers him a new job for the Zephyr Weather Dynamics based in Los Angeles. Though reluctant to move to L.A., Ron accepts the offering while Dr. Newmeyer decides to stay at home. Ron is introduced to General Roberts who has revived the weather control project and wants Ron to help him achieve the goal of developing and steering the storms and hurricanes which could be used as a covert and deniable weapon of mass destruction. Ron is also introduced to the remainder of the team consisting of unknown meteorologist Dr. Daniel Platt and Major Tanya Goodman who flies the C-123 transport aircraft. Ron finds the activities suspicious and contacts Brian to find any information about the project and the people involved in it, although he is reminded of the covert work. He quickly finds out that the Zephyr Weather Dynamics is a continuation of the General Roberts failed weather control project.

Ron helps the team to develop the weather control software for use in the improved version of the storm generator seen in the beginning of the film. After the generator is ready, General Roberts orders the team to launch it into the weather front off the U.S. West Coast to generate the hurricane and steer it to Mexico. The hurricane is successfully generated but the control of the generator is lost so Dr. Platt is sent airborne to try to re-establish a connection with the generator. When he succeeds, Dr. Platt decides to steer it away from Mexican coast. This enrages General Roberts who orders the immediate execution of Dr. Platt. With the death of Dr. Platt the control over the generator is lost and the hurricane steers to the north towards Los Angeles.

After Ron discovers the General Roberts plans he starts to uncover more data about the experiment and also passes some secret information to Brian and Andrea McIntyre, a weather reporter working in L.A. who was dating him in the past. Soon after that Major Goodman invites Ron to dinner. They both get drunk and Ron falls asleep. The next morning Brian's wife informs him that Brian has died in a car accident. Immediately after the call the police arrives and orders Ron to go with them because he is framed for killing of a woman and her daughter in the car accident. Believing that both Brian's death and the charge he is facing are a revenge of General Roberts for sharing the top-secret information outside the team he escapes and infiltrates the company. He faces Major Goodman but is beaten down by Holt who brings him to General Roberts.

It is revealed that Holt is a rogue CIA agent who staged both Brian's death and blamed Ron for a hit-and run accident he didn't commit. General Roberts then tells Ron about the coming destruction of L.A. and asks him for the help to recover the storm generator. He boards a plane piloted by Major Goodman and finds the generator. After a risky operation Ron manages to intercept the generator and switches it off manually. General Roberts then orders that the generator is released again and reactivated to steer the hurricane towards Mexico. Refusing to do so, Ron is first assaulted by Holt and later by Major Goodman. As she holds Ron at gunpoint, the plane hits the storm generator which destroys both plane and the generator. Ron manages to bail out with the parachute and is reunited with Andrea who reports from a nearly saved Los Angeles.

Cast

 Luke Perry as Dr. Ron Young
 Martin Sheen as General James Roberts
 Robert Knott as Tom Holt
 David Moses as Dr. Daniel Platt
 Alexandra Powers as Major Tanya Goodman
 Marc McClure as Dr. Brian Newmeyer
 Renée Estevez as Andrea McIntyre
 Glenn Shadix as Nate

Reception
Variety said the film, "feels a lot like yesterday’s news, pitting man against nature with very little emotion attached, few twists and a dated treatment more in line with bargain-basement comic books."

References

External links
 

1999 films
1990s disaster films
American disaster films
American science fiction thriller films
1990s science fiction thriller films
1990s English-language films
Films about tropical cyclones
Films about weather hazards
Films scored by Nathan Wang
1990s American films